Khvorakabad (also Romanized as Khvorākābād and Khowrākābād; also known as Kharkābād) is a village in Mazraeh Now Rural District, in the Central District of Ashtian County, Markazi Province, Iran. At the 2006 census, its population was 72, in 23 families.

References 

Populated places in Ashtian County